Cătina is a commune in Buzău County, Muntenia, Romania. It is composed of five villages: Cătina, Corbu, Slobozia, Valea Cătinei and Zeletin.

Notable people
Cornelia Catangă (from Zeletin)

References

Communes in Buzău County
Localities in Muntenia